Bunillidh Thistle Football Club is a senior Scottish football club playing in the North Caledonian Football League based at Couper Park representing the village of Helmsdale in the Scottish Highlands.

History 
Bunillidh Thistle joined the North Caledonian League in the early 1970s, where they competed until their withdrawal at the end of the 2008–09 season. They enjoyed their most successful period in the mid-1980s, winning the league championship on two occasions, first in 1982–83 and again in 1988–89.

In 2017, the club were reformed and readmitted to the North Caledonian League ahead of the 2017–18 season.

Honours 
 North Caledonian League
 Champions: 1982–83, 1988–89
 North Caledonian Cup
 Winners: 1971–72, 1981–82
 Football Times Cup
 Winners: 1986–87, 2001–02
 Chic Allan Cup
 Winners: 1976–77, 1982–83, 1986–87
 MacNicol Trophy
 Winners: 1972–73
 Ness Cup
 Winners: 1973–74

References

External links
 Facebook

Helmsdale
Football clubs in Scotland
Football in Highland (council area)
North Caledonian Football League teams
Sport in Sutherland